Bruchiana is a genus of moth in the family Gelechiidae. It contains the species Bruchiana cassiaella, which is found in Argentina.

The wingspan is about 19 mm.

References

Gelechiinae